Gary Richard Dotter (born August 7, 1942) is an American former professional baseball player.

Dotter signed with his hometown St. Louis Cardinals after high school, but was drafted out of the Redbird farm system after his first minor league season in Class D, then the lowest classification of the minors. After posting 14 wins with the 1961 Wilson Tobs of the Class B Carolina League, he was recalled by the Twins that September. He made his debut by pitching four innings in relief against the Kansas City Athletics. He did a creditable job for his first three innings — giving up only one earned run — but in his fourth frame, he surrendered five runs and was replaced on the mound by a non-pitcher, first baseman Julio Bécquer.

Dotter would appear in six other MLB games for Minnesota in relief over his career, and pitch well.  He worked in a total of seven Major League games and 12 ⅓ innings pitched, surrendering nine hits seven earned runs, walking seven and striking out ten.

But he spent the remainder of his professional career in the minor leagues, retiring after the 1967 campaign with a 55–40 won-lost record.

References

External links

Retrosheet
Venezuelan Professional Baseball League

1942 births
Amarillo Sonics players
Baseball players from St. Louis
Charlotte Hornets (baseball) players
Dallas Rangers players
Durham Bulls players
Industriales de Valencia players
Keokuk Cardinals players
Living people
Major League Baseball pitchers
Minnesota Twins players
Oklahoma City 89ers players
Wilson Tobs players